The discography of Feist, a Canadian singer-songwriter, consists of five studio albums, eight singles and a remix album as well as four releases with Broken Social Scene.

Feist spent much of her early career collaborating with various bands and artists, such as By Divine Right, who she toured with for three years. In 1999 she released her first solo album, Monarch (Lay Your Jewelled Head Down), though the record didn't receive the attention of her later works. 2001 saw her work with Kevin Drew and Brendan Canning on Feel Good Lost, the first album by Broken Social Scene. Feist would go on to appear on every one of the band's albums and toured intermittently with them until 2005.

Her second solo album, Let It Die, brought Feist to an international audience, charting in multiple countries whilst garnering three nominations at the 2005 Juno Awards with wins for Best Alternative Album and Best New Artist. The record has since gone platinum in Canada. In 2006, she released Open Season, a remix album of Let It Die featuring collaborations with various artists. Her fourth album, The Reminder, which was released in 2007, proved to be her most successful yet. The album charted at number 16 on the Billboard 200 and would go on to win the Shortlist Music Prize. The second single, "1234", was also a worldwide hit after being featured in an advertisement for the third-generation iPod Nano.

Albums

Studio albums

Remix albums

Video albums

Singles

Appearances

Guest appearances

Other appearances

Music videos

Notes

References

External links
 
 [ Feist] at Allmusic
 Feist at Discogs

Discographies of Canadian artists
Alternative rock discographies
Pop music discographies